Iron, when used metaphorically, refers to certain traits of the metal iron. Used as an adjective and sometimes as a noun, it refers to something stern, harsh, strong, unyielding, inflexible, rigid, sturdy, strong, robust, hard.

List of iron metaphors

Persons and characters
 Iron Duke (disambiguation)
 Iron Felix (disambiguation)
 Iron Lady (disambiguation)
 Iron Man (disambiguation)
 Iron Mike (disambiguation)
 Princess Iron Fan (disambiguation)
 Otto von Bismarck, known as the Iron Chancellor
 Iron Chef, a Japanese cooking show
 , known as Iron Eye
 Iron Eyes Cody, Sicilian-American actor
 The Iron Heinrich, a rough translation of the German fairy tale The Frog Prince
 Iron Heroes, a variant book of rules for the game Dungeons & Dragons
 Iron John, a German fairy tale
 Eon Kid, English title of the TV series Iron Kid
 Iron Lad, a fictional superhero
 Iron Maniac, an evil alternative universe character of fictional Marvel superhero Iron Man
 Iron Munro, a fictional superhero
 Persephone, known as the Iron Queen
 Hossein Khosrow Ali Vaziri, known as the Iron Sheik
 Iron Shell, Brule Sioux chief
 Iron Tail, Oglala Sioux warrior
 Tigran Petrosian, known as Iron Tigran
 Timur as a name, meaning iron in Turkic languages, widespread in Western and Central Asia since the days of the Mongol Empire
Hadid is an Arabic name (both given and surname) literally meaning "iron"

Animals and plants
 Iron Bird (disambiguation)
 Iron Butterfly (disambiguation)
 Iron Dragon (disambiguation)
 Iron Eagle (disambiguation)
 Iron Monkey (disambiguation)
 Iron Wolf (disambiguation)
 Iron horse (disambiguation)
 Iron wood (disambiguation)
 Ferrocalamus (iron bamboo)
 Iron cobra, a "construct" in the game Dungeons & Dragons
 Iron condor, an option trading strategy utilizing two vertical spreads
 Iron Kong, a fictional character from the science fiction media franchise Zoids

Body parts
 Iron Fist (disambiguation)
 Iron Hand (disambiguation)
 Iron Hands (disambiguation)
 Iron lung (disambiguation)
 See Joseph LaFlesche
 The Iron Heel, a 1908 dystopian novel
 Iron Palm, a body of training techniques in various Chinese martial arts

Geography
 Iron City (disambiguation)
 Iron Mountain (disambiguation)
 Iron River (disambiguation)
 Iron Range, regions around Lake Superior in the United States and Canada

Other iron metaphors
 Iron Bird (disambiguation)
 Iron Curtain (disambiguation)
 Iron Maiden (disambiguation)
 Iron Triangle (disambiguation)
 Unguided bomb, known as an iron bomb
 Iron Brigade, a Civil War brigade
 Iron cage, a sociology term
 Iron Fire, a Danish power and speed metal band
 Iron Guard, a historical far-right movement in Romania
 Iron harvest, an annual "harvest" collected by Belgian and French farmers after ploughing their fields
 Iron Helix, a 1993 video game
 Iron Seed, a 1994 DOS video game
 Iron shirt, a form of hard style martial art exercise
 Iron Sunrise, a 2004 hard science fiction novel
 Iron Will, a 1994 film

Gallery

See also
 Iron (disambiguation)
 Big Iron, a country ballad

References

Further reading
 Theodore Wertime and James Muhly, eds., The Coming of the Age of Iron (Yale, 1980) (hardcover)
 "Iron, Master of Them All" from the University of Iowa Museum of Art and Project for the Advanced Study of Art and Life in Africa, discussing various metaphors (associated with iron) in African cultures.

Metaphors
Linguistics lists